The Clyde River is a tributary of Lake Memphremagog, over  long, in northern Vermont in the United States. It is the easternmost of the four major rivers in Orleans County. It is the most powerful of the four within Orleans County, powering several turbines at damsites. It is part of the Northern Forest Canoe Trail.

It was named by one of the early surveyors from his partiality to a river of the same name in Scotland.

Geography
With the exception of three miles (5 km) of rapids near its mouth, this is a very sluggish stream, passing through in its course, several natural ponds of considerable size. Even during spring high water, there is barely a perceptible current.

Course
The river has its source in Spectacle Pond in Brighton. The Southern part of Spectacle Pond is part of Brighton State Park. Spectacle Pond is actually a kettle.

Higher course of the river (segment of )

  toward Northwest up to East bank of Island Pond;
  toward Northwest crossing the Island Pond toward Island Pond up to the mouth of the pond
  toward the Southwest crossing the city of Island Pond et passing at South of Bluff Mountain, up to the confluence of Pherrins River (coming from North).

Intermediary course of the river (segment of )

From the mouth of Pherrins River, the Clyde River flow as follow:
  toward Southwest, up to Oswegatchie Pond (coming from South);
  toward Northwest, snaking between Rosebrook Hill (located on South side) and Dollif Mountain (located on North side) up to the discharge of Mud Pounds (coming from North);
  toward Northwest, up to the limit of Charleston;
  toward Northwest in Charleston, up to the discharge (coming from North-East) of a lake;
  toward Northwest, un to Lang Brook (coming from North);
  toward North-West by passing an island at the end of this segment, up to Back Brook (coming from the South);
  toward Northwest, up to Mad Brook (coming from South);
  toward Northwest, passing at Northeast of Deer Hill, up to the discharge (coming from North) of Lake Echo and from Lake Seymour; the confluence of this discharge is located at the South of East Charleston village;
  toward Northwest, splitting in two for bypassing an island, then snaking up to the discharge (coming from South) of Toad Pond;

Lower course of the river (segment of )
  Northward crossing Pensioner Pond up to the mouth where the lake is narrowing and curving to Northwest;
  Northward up to the South bank of Charleston Pond;
  Northward up to the dam at the mouth of Charleston Pond;
  to Northwest up to South bank of a lake;
  to Northwest crossing Lake Salem up to the mouth;
  Westward forming a curve to North, crossing the Interstate 91 and snaking up to the dam located at the Northeast end of Clyde Pond #1;
  to Southwest, crossing Clyde Pond #1, up to the dam on West bank of the pond;
  to West up crossing the city of Newport up to the confluence at the South bank of the Lake Memphremagog.

Charleston
The Clyde River is the largest in Charleston. It runs nearly through the center of the town.

Derby
The Clyde River forms the principal water-course, flowing through the town from east to west.

After exiting from Clyde Pond #1, it proceeds westward. It empties into Lake Salem from the south. It exits the northwest corner of this lake. It is then joined by an unnamed brook from Derby Pond from the north. It then empties into Clyde Pond #2 from the northeast. It exits this Pond west and into south Lake Memphremagog from the north. The mouth is just east of where US 5/Vermont 105 crosses Lake Memphremagog.

Natural history
Beavers populate the countryside and sometimes undercut the streamside silver maple, toppling them into the water and creating logjams.

The river winds through farm country, with silver maple and alder dominating the shoreline.

Geology
The river is in the Nulhegan Basin of northeastern Vermont.

History

Toponymy

The term "Clyde" is a popular first name with English origin. This term is also used as surname.

This toponym was officialized on October 29, 1980 at Geographic Names Information System (GNIS) of US federal government.

Dams
In the early 19th century a mill dam constructed at Arnolds Falls. In
1883 a dam was constructed at the outlet to Lake Memphremagog. In
1918 the Newport Dam (Clyde Pond #2) was constructed. This dam was also known as Prouty Dam (after Governor Prouty). This was also known as the Clyde Pond dam.

The Echo Lake dam is not used for hydroelectric power. Construction was completed in 1922. It is owned by Great Bay Hydro Corporation. The dam is concrete. The core is homogeneous concrete. The foundation is rock.

In 1928 a dam was constructed at West Charleston. In
1929 a dam was built at Pensioner's Pond.

In 1957 #11 Dam was constructed.
In 1994 the #11 Dam was breached. In 1996 the #11 Dam was removed. In
2007 a fish (salmon) passage was built at the Newport Dam. Salmon fishing in Lake Memphremagog and the Clyde nearly stopped when the dam was constructed. It has improved since the dam's removal. The State of Vermont stocks the river with 30,000 salmon annually. 6,000 perish immediately from predators. Of those that make the journey to Lake Memphremagog, 18,000 return to spawn. The remainder assumed to be caught by fishermen.

Lists

Tributaries
The following dams are on tributaries (watershed) that feed into the Clyde, and not the Clyde itself:

Lake Seymour is on a tributary which drains into Echo Lake, which in turn drains into the Clyde. It is not used for hydroelectric power. Construction of the original dam was completed in 1928. It is owned by Great Bay Hydro Corporation. This dam is stone, and concrete. The core is concrete. The foundation is soil.

List of cities and towns
In upstream order:

Newport, Vermont
Derby, Vermont
Charleston, Vermont
West Charleston (village)
East Charleston (village)
Brighton, Vermont
Island Pond, Vermont

See also

Pherrins River, Vermont
Lake Memphremagog
List of rivers of Vermont

Footnotes

References and external links
Map of Clyde River

 

Rivers of Vermont
Lake Memphremagog
Derby, Vermont
Charleston, Vermont
Brighton, Vermont
Island Pond, Vermont
Newport (city), Vermont
Northeast Kingdom, Vermont
Bodies of water of Essex County, Vermont
Rivers of Orleans County, Vermont
Tributaries of the Saint Lawrence River
Northern Forest Canoe Trail